Giovannino de' Grassi (c.1350 - 6 July 1398) was an Italian architect, sculptor, painter and illuminator.

Life
He was born in Milan, Italy, in the 14th century, although the year of his birth is uncertain.

References 

14th-century births
1398 deaths
Architects from Milan
14th-century Italian architects
14th-century Italian sculptors
14th-century Italian painters
Manuscript illuminators
Artists from Milan